Oma Mua ('own land') is a Karelian-language newspaper published in Republic of Karelia.

First issue was published in 1990 by Periodika.

See also
Karjalan Sanomat
Vienan Karjala

References

External links 

Karelian language
Newspapers published in Russia